The 2017–18 Kategoria e Parë was the 70th official season of the Albanian football second division since its establishment. The season began on 16 September 2017 and ended on 16 May 2018. There were 20 teams competing this season, split in 2 groups, each with 10 teams. The top 5 teams from each group qualified to the promotion round, while the last teams qualified to the relegation round. The 2 winners of the qualification round gained promotion to the 2018–19 Kategoria Superiore, and played the division's final against each other. Kastrioti and Tirana were promoted to the 2018–19 Kategoria Superiore. Naftëtari, Shkumbini, Tërbuni, Vllaznia B were relegated to the 2018−19 Kategoria e Dytë. Tirana won their first Kategoria e Parë title on 16 May 2018 after beating Kastrioti in the final match.

Changes from last season

Team changes

From Kategoria e Parë
Promoted to Kategoria Superiore:
 KF Lushnja
 FC Kamza

Relegated to Kategoria e Dytë:
 Adriatiku
 KF Elbasani
 Sopoti

To Kategoria e Parë
Relegated from Kategoria Superiore:
 KF Tirana
 Korabi

Promoted from Kategoria e Dytë:
 FK Egnatia
 Naftëtari
 Vllaznia B

Locations

Stadia by capacity and locations

Group A

Group B

Source:

First phase

Group A

Group B

Second phase

Promotion round

Group A

Group B

Relegation round

Group A

Group B

Final

Relegation play-offs

Season statistics

Scoring

Top scorers

References

2017-18
2
2017–18 in European second tier association football leagues